Jonas Müller may refer to:
 Jonas Müller (ice hockey)
 Jonas Müller (luger)